The Chiguanco thrush (Turdus chiguanco) is a species of bird in the family Turdidae. It is found in Ecuador and the Altiplano. Its natural habitats are subtropical or tropical high-altitude shrubland and heavily degraded former forest.

Gallery

References

Chiguanco thrush
Chiguanco thrush
Birds of the Ecuadorian Andes
Birds of the Puna grassland
Chiguanco thrush
Taxonomy articles created by Polbot